R. L. Stine's The Haunting Hour: The Series is  an original anthology horror-fantasy television series which is based on the 2007 movie R.L Stine's The Haunting Hour: Don't Think About It and the anthologies The Haunting Hour and Nightmare Hour by R.L. Stine, that originally aired on The Hub Network from October 29, 2010 to October 11, 2014. The only story taken from The Haunting Hour anthology was My Imaginary Friend, and the only story unused from The Nightmare Hour was Make Me a Witch. The fourth season's seven remaining episodes ran on Discovery Family from October 18, 2014 to November 29, 2014. The series was produced by Front Street Pictures, The Hatchery, Incendo Films, and Endemol.

On July 9, 2012, it was announced that R. L. Stine's The Haunting Hour was one of four original series from The Hub that won the CINE Golden Eagle Award for high quality production and storytelling.

The series received critical acclaim throughout its run and is considered to be the best children's horror anthology show as well as one of the best horror anthologies in general with praise given to the acting (from both the child and adult actors), production value, dark tone, direction, storytelling, gothic atmosphere and style, scares and effects.

On December 8, 2014, it was confirmed by Stine via Twitter that Discovery Family cancelled the show after its run of four seasons.

Production
Prior to the broadcast of the series, series creator R. L. Stine reported via Twitter saying The Haunting Hour: The Series was similar to his previous series Goosebumps. The series was filmed in Vancouver, British Columbia, Canada.

Premise
Like Goosebumps, every episode features a different cast in a scary situation that would involve ghosts, aliens, witches, zombies, and monsters. However, the storylines are much darker than its aforementioned predecessor and some episodes serve as very dark morality tales. Unlike the Goosebumps series, the threat of death is not implied, being both clear and permanent. In addition, death in the show is not limited to antagonists and minor characters with some stories even ending with the main protagonist(s) being killed. There are some episodes that have twist endings for some of the episodes. However, there are some episodes that have happy endings similar to most of the episodes of Are You Afraid of the Dark? which had this formula.

Episodes

Home media

Accolades

Made Of Matches

"Made Of Matches" is a song performed, written and produced by American actress, singer and songwriter Debby Ryan. It was released as a digital download on March 29, 2011, as a promotional single in the United States by The Hatchery label. The song is featured in the episode "Wrong Number" that Ryan also appears in. It was not included on any studio album or soundtrack.

Composition
A midtempo pop rock song, "Made of Matches" exhibits elements of  alternative rock and pop. Built on a beat, multi-tracked harmonies, the song's instrumentation includes slow-bouncing electric guitar and drums.

In an interview with Cambio, Ryan commented about writing a song for the first time "It's very much my heart. 'Made of Matches' was kind of the first time I've really expressed myself through Music personally". On April 6, 2011, Ryan commented on Twitter that "Writing has always been a release for me, and lately I've fallen in love with the music production. Knitting together my stories and feelings."

Music video
The official music video for the song premiered on The Hub on February 4, 2011. The video was directed by Neill Fearnley with scenes from the episode "Wrong Number."

Books 
In 2001 Stine released The Haunting Hour: Chills in the Dead of Night, a collection of 10 short stories featuring illustrations by various artists. A reviewer for the Tampa Bay Times wrote favorably of the collection and stated that it would be best for children over the age of eight. Booklist was also favorable.

This, along with the 2007 film and the 1999 horror collection Nightmare Hour, helped form the basis of the television series. Of The Haunting Hour, only  "My Imaginary Friend" was adapted into an episode.

References

External links

 

2010s American anthology television series
2010s American drama television series
2010s American horror television series
2010s American science fiction television series
2010s American supernatural television series
2010 American television series debuts
2014 American television series endings
2010s Canadian anthology television series
2010s Canadian drama television series
2010s Canadian science fiction television series
2010 Canadian television series debuts
2014 Canadian television series endings
Angels in television
American fantasy television series
American television shows featuring puppetry
Canadian horror fiction television series
Canadian fantasy television series
Canadian supernatural television series
Canadian television shows featuring puppetry
Dark fantasy television series
Demons in television
English-language television shows
Television about fairies and sprites
Television series about ghosts
Television about magic
R. L. Stine
Robots in television
Television series by Endemol
Vampires in television
Television about werewolves
Witchcraft in television
Zombies in television
Discovery Family original programming
Television shows filmed in Vancouver